The Black Caviar Lightning, registered as the Lightning Stakes, is a Victoria Racing Club Group 1 thoroughbred horse race at Weight for Age, run over a distance of 1000 metres at Flemington Racecourse, Melbourne, Australia in February. Prize money is A$1,000,000.

History
The Lightning Stakes forms the first leg of the three leg Autumn sprint series over the Melbourne carnival. It precedes the G1 Oakleigh Plate (1100m, open handicap) at Caulfield Racecourse on the third Saturday in February and the G1 Newmarket Handicap (1200m, open handicap), Australia's most famous sprinting handicap, also run at Flemington on the first Saturday in March. Horses contesting this race may also head to the G1 William Reid Stakes at Moonee Valley Racecourse, run over 1200m at weight-for-age in March.

Name
The name of the race changed from the Lightning Stakes in 2013, to honour sprinting superstar Black Caviar, who won the race in 2011, 2012 and 2013.

Distance
 1955–1972 - 5 furlongs (~1000 metres)
 1973 onwards - 1000 metres

Grade
 1955–1979 - Principal race
 1980–1986 - Group 2 
 1987 onwards - Group 1

Venue
 In 2007 the race was run at Moonee Valley Racecourse due to refurbishment work at Flemington Racecourse.

International affiliation

Since 2005 the race has been the first leg of the Global Sprint Challenge, followed by the Australia Stakes and from 2008 followed by the King's Stand Stakes when the Australia Stakes was replaced as a leg of the series by The Age Classic. Until Nicconi's defeat in the 2010 King's Stand Stakes at Royal Ascot held in June, this race has proved an outstanding guide to the winner of that race, with Choisir (2003), Takeover Target (2006), Miss Andretti (2007) and Scenic Blast (2009) all winning this race before subsequently winning at Royal Ascot later that year.

Most wins
 Black Caviar (3)

Winners

 2023 - Coolangatta
 2022 - Home Affairs
 2021 – Nature Strip
 2020 – Gytrash
 2019 – In Her Time
 2018 – Redkirk Warrior
 2017 – Terravista
 2016 – Chautauqua
 2015 – Lankan Rupee
 2014 – Snitzerland
 2013 – Black Caviar
 2012 – Black Caviar
 2011 – Black Caviar
 2010 – Nicconi
 2009 – Scenic Blast
 2008 – Apache Cat
 2007 – Miss Andretti
 2006 – Takeover Target
 2005 – Fastnet Rock
 2004 – Regimental Gal
 2003 – Choisir
 2002 – Spinning Hill
 2001 – Sports
 2000 – Testa Rossa
 1999 – Isca
 1998 – General Nediym
 1997 – Mahogany
 1996 – Gold Ace
 1995 – Mahogany
 1994 – Keltrice
 1993 – Schillaci
 1992 – Schillaci
 1991 – Shaftesbury Avenue
 1990 – Redelva
 1989 – Zeditave
 1988 – Special
 1987 – Placid Ark
 1986 – Hula Chief
 1985 – River Rough
 1984 – River Rough
 1983 – Demus
 1982 – He's A Haze
 1981 – Countess Marizza
 1980 – Sportscast
 1979 – The Judge
 1978 – Maybe Mahal
 1977 – Maybe Mahal
 1976 – Desirable
 1975 – Cap D'antibes
 1974 – Century
 1973 – Make Mine Roses
 1972 – Zambari
 1971 – Dual Choice
 1970 – Black Onyx
 1969 – Mister Hush
 1968 – Begonia Belle
 1967 – Storm Queen
 1966 – Citius
 1965 – Marmion
 1964 – Wenona Girl
 1963 – Wenona Girl
 1962 – Sky High
 1961 – Sky High
 1960 – Todman
 1959 – Ritmar
 1958 – Misting
 1957 – Copper Year
 1956 – Apple Bay
 1955 – Gay Vista

See also
 List of Australian Group races
 Group races

References

Open sprint category horse races
Group 1 stakes races in Australia
Flemington Racecourse